The Miss Ecuador 2004 pageant was held on March 4, 2004. There were 14 candidates for the national title. Susana Rivadeneira from Pichincha was crowned by Andrea Jácome from Guayas. The winner represented Ecuador at Miss Universe 2004.

Results

Placements

Special awards

Contestants

Notes

Returns

Last compete in:

1999
 Los Ríos
2002
 Manabí

External links
https://web.archive.org/web/20090212202036/http://hoy.com.ec/especial/2004/missecua/inicio.htm
https://web.archive.org/web/20090615075116/http://www.beauland.net/news/2004/03-mar.html
https://web.archive.org/web/20090202062509/http://especiales.eluniverso.com/especiales/2004/missuniverso2004/susana_rivadeneira.asp
http://www.bellezavenezolana.net/news/2004/Marzo/20040305.htm

Miss Ecuador
2004 beauty pageants
Beauty pageants in Ecuador
2004 in Ecuador